Wilbur Award may refer to:

 The Richard Wilbur Award - a poetry award sponsored by the University of Evansville
 The Wilbur Awards - a religious communication award sponsored by the Religion Communicators Council